Paliath Achan or Paliyath Achan is the name given to the male members of the Paliam royal family, a Menon royal family from the Indian state of Kerala that ruled over Chendamangalam, Vypin, parts of Thrissur and regions that were under the erstwhile Kingdom of Villarvattom. The family had Palaces/Forts in these regions but their primary residence remained in Chendamangalam. Although, they were Rajas in these areas(collectively known as the Paliyam swaroopam) and pledged their obeisance to the Maharajah of Kingdom of Cochin (Kerala), they were placed above the post of the Princes of Kingdom of Cochin. This was because the Achans had held hereditary rights to the prime ministership of Cochin and effected a treaty with the Dutch East India Company(to oust the Portuguese East India Company that had control over the Kingdom of Cochin) which placed him second in position to the Maharajah of Kingdom of Cochin and sometimes exerting more power than the king.

Overview and origins
The Paliath Achans were hereditary prime ministers to the Maharajah of Kingdom of Cochin (Kerala) from 1632 to 1809 and second only to the Maharajah in power and wealth in the central Cochin area during that period. The Paliath Achans were also the free rulers of Chendamangalam, Vypin, parts of Thrissur and regions that were under the erstwhile Kingdom of Villarvattom. However, debt and poor management had strained the family’s resources, and so the Cochin government issued the Paliam Proclamation, under which the Paliam swaroopam came under the state for 12 years. The origins of the Paliam family are not very clear. One view is that the Paliam family is descended from the Villarvattom Royal family in Chendamangalam. The other view is that the Paliam family is linked to the Cochin royal family or Perumpadappu Swarupam. It is thought that when the last Perumal departed, the Chera Kingdom of Mahodayapuram split with one segment leaving for Vanneri near Chowghat. It is thought that the powerful feudal chieftain (during the Chera era), Paliath Achan also left with this segment. Until recently, a "Paliam Parambu" (Paliam Grounds) was found there. Quite possibly, Paliath Achan moved with the Perumpadappu Swarupam to Thiruvanchikulam due to the Zamorin's invasion. The flood of 1341 brought the Perumpaddappu Swaroopam to Kochi, and Paliath Achan may have moved with them as well. In Chendamangalam, over a period of time, the Paliath Achan became a powerful man in the kingdom, second only to the King himself by dint of hard work and administrative ability. To the Paliam family dereliction of duty was an anathema. Obviously, from the 16th to the 19th centuries, the successive Paliath Achans dominated the politics of Cochin. The dame luck was in favor of hard working Paliath. Originally they were accountants to the royal family and by the 1590s their fortunes began to swell as the ruler gave them the seat of a dead chieftain, and in 1622 a portion of  Vypin Island. Then they got the  hereditary premiership of Cochin. As a member of the family, Paliath Ravi Achan puts it, “We were not born lords. We were made lords." Born or made, in the generations that followed, the Achans did much for Cochin. The kingdom was shaped largely by dynamics between the ruler and successive European powers, mediated through the ubiquitous Achan. The Paliam family helped manage the Portuguese, and then when the latter grew overbearing, conspired with the Dutch to oust them. During succession disputes, the Achans sided with the legitimate heirs, fighting battles and using diplomacy.The Achans' exalted position meant that for weddings and major ceremonies, even such personages as the Maharajah of Travancore (Cochin’s richer, powerful rival to the south) sent representatives with presents.

Titles 
Although the members of the Paliam family were Nair/Menon's, they had their own lordly titles. The boys were called Kuttans, and girls Pillas. Upon attaining majority, they graduated to Achans and Kunjammas. The oldest members of the family were addressed as Valiachans and Valiammas. In the Nalukettu, the Valiamma had an ornate canopy bed, seated on which she settled domestic issues in the family. The Valiachan, on the other hand, stayed in the Kovilakam or palace, reconstructed by the Dutch which had a platform in the upstairs balcony from where he addressed the common folk.

Traditions and customs 

 Whenever a baby was born, the arrival was recorded by the majordomo. Specific ornaments were given, which belonged to the newborn for life.
 Since the family was part of the Nair community, it was matriarchal in its traditions. The wedlock of female members were primarily to Namboodiri Brahmins, Cochin Royal family, Other Royal family members of erstwhile Travancore and Malabar areas. The Brahmin husbands were allotted special buildings and servitors called the Easwara Seva or “worship” building.
 All the food was to be cooked by Brahmins. Assisting them were dozens of Nair women, chopping and cleaning.
 At 16, every paliam boy had to undergo the mandatory bhajanam — 12 months of rituals as a rite of passage. Till they were 16, the boys were served food in cut plantain leaves; after the bhajanam , they graduated to a full leaf and had to move into the bachelors’ dormitory. The only time thereafter they could go into the main house was during mealtimes. Otherwise, that space was reserved for women.
 The family being a joint family meant that if a member left to stay with her husband in his palace, she could not return to claim physical space. Although, sometimes exceptions were made to this rule.
 Men would receive cash and paddy allowances until their mid-20s whereas for the females, everything was provided by the management, including three servants per lady.

The Tharavadu Palace

The main family Tharavadu (Naalukettu) is approximately 450 years old. It was in this Nalukettu that the Paliam family settled after shifting from Vanneri to Chendamangalam. This Nalukettu is a self contained double storeyed building with eight bedrooms in the south and kitchen and the well in the northeast corner. It houses the Ara, the strong room, for the safekeeping of the family heirlooms. Interestingly, below the Ara is the concealed nether room with a secret exit. It is built in the Kerala style. The beautifully laid out entrance foyer, purathu thalam , is still a great attraction, not only to the family members, but also the tourists who come here. There is a wide courtyard all around the Nalukettu. The benign presence of Paliam tharavad Bhagavathy is just nearby. The complex contained a huge Nalu Kettu with Nadu mittam, Akayi and Purathalam where the members gathered for chatting and other recreational activities. There used to be a common dining hall and a common kitchen. All the members dined together and lived together under the protection of Valiachan. In this kind of community living, they had no access to money rather there was no need for money - everything was provided by the administration. The male members who became majors, had separate bachelor living quarters and after their marriage, they lived in houses provided by the administration. This style of 'community living' continued till the partition.The Paliam Palace, a two story structure ( GF and 2 F)  with minimum ornamentation was made mostly of quality wood built on the surrounding thick walls, the structure boasts of richly carved  wooden staircases and balustrades. The thick walls with splayed openings bear testimony to the Dutch influence. To keep indoors cooler during hot days a circulation channel  runs through the inner parts, insulating the interior. So inner portions are cooler than peripheral areas. Kovilakam was the official  residence of Valiyachan (Eldest Achan) of Paliam and was meant for only official work. Also used by him are two other places for different purposes - as  his offices. Achan  would hold court (Durbar) with people and listened to their grievances or complaints. The durbar hall is  at the eastern end of the first floor. Here, he received his subjects and officials.

The prime minister in time of war or some kind of tumultuous political situation emerging in the kingdom sheltered  and shielded the King for safety purposes.  During Portuguese invasions, the European explorers made serious threats to the Maharajah of Cochin as he refused to  oblige them in their mercantile trade activities in his areas.  So  Paliath Achan took the responsibility of  safeguarding  the ruler and  temporarily shifted his residence to this palace in Chendamangalam. The Kovilakam (palace) houses a large number of artefacts including ancient documents, religious sacraments, swords, rifles, and gifts brought by foreign dignitaries. The Paliath Achan's Kovilakam, which was reconstructed by the Dutch, exists adjacent to the Tharavadu. Guards in khaki with guns were posted around the estate to ensure the rules were not breached. The buildings in the area date anywhere from 60 to 300 years. Till 1956, the complex housed 214 residents, as well as its own doctors and a school, not to speak of elephants, boats, and a stately car.

Significance in Kerala history

The Zamorin invaded Cochin in 1757. Due to the diplomatic efforts of the Paliath Achan, the Kingdom of Cochin was saved. During Hyder Ali's conquest of the south of India in 1776, the Paliath Achan was able to effect a treaty between Hyder Ali and the Cochin Raja.

In 1806, Paliath Achan, became the virtual ruler of the Kingdom of Cochin since the Maharaja of Cochin was a spiritual and religious scholar and totally disinterested in ruling the State.  In 1808, the British East India Company were trying to persuade the Raja of Kochi's men to defect their side. They had succeeded in getting the support of Nadavarambu Kunhikrishna Menon. Paliath Govindan Achan was provoked by this. He took with him 600 Nair soldiers and attacked the headquarters of Colonel Macaulay, the local British Resident, who was forced to flee. Following the attack, Paliath Achan and his men broke open the local jails and set free any prisoners found inside. The Paliath Achan later joined the Travancore alliance of Velu Thampi Dalawa. During 1809 and 1810, Paliath Achan, allied with Velu Thampi Dalawa, fought the British on Travancore soil. Achan engaged the British East India Company troops in battle, and was defeated. After the rebellion, the British authorities deported him to Madras, where he was imprisoned at Fort St. George for 12 years. He was then taken to Bombay and remained a prisoner there for 13 years, finally passing away at Benares 1832. Paliath Govindan Achan was the last Paliath Achan to occupy the position of Prime Minister in the Kingdom of Cochin.

Another notable Paliath Achan includes Komi Achan I. Komi Achan I resisted the attempts by the Portuguese to impose their power on the Cochin Family. He allied himself with the Dutch, travelling to Colombo to sign a treaty with them. He also supported the Dutch against the Portuguese. In recognition of his efforts, the Dutch built him a palace (the Kovilakam) at Chendamangalam.

Between 1730 and 1740 the status of the Cochin kingdom dwindled due consolidation of power in Travancore under Marthanda Varma combined with the waning influence of the Dutch and a large-scale invasion by the Zamorin from the north. Paliath Komi Achan was able to effect a treaty between the Cochin and Travancore Kingdoms. This treaty facilitated the defeat of the Zamorin.

The Chendamangalam Jews sing "The Song of Paliathachan" in which they mention the mention "Nayar Noblemen" who bestowed upon the Jews "gifts and books to all those who come, and titles to foreigners".

In the Vishnuvilasam Hamsappattu, a Malayalam poem about the life of Vishnu (as spoken by a swan), the poet (Kunjan Nambiar) makes a reference to a Paliath Achan named Kuberan:

ശ്രീ കുബേരാഖ്യഗനം പാലിയാധീഷരന്റേ
ശ്രീ കുലാഡംബരം ചെമ്മേ വരൊത്തൊന്ന
ശ്രീ കാന്തദേവന്‍ ജയന്താലയേശ്വരന്‍
ശ്രീ കണ്ഠ്സേവിതന്‍ ശ്രീന്യസിംഹാക്യതി
ശ്രേയസ്സു നല്‍കും നിനക്കിന്നു ഹംസമേ!

SrI kubErAkhyaganam pAliyAdhIsharantE
SrI kulADambaram chemmE varoththonna
SrI kAnthadEvan jayanthAlayEaSvaran
SrEyassu nalkum ninakkinnu hamsamE!

Kochu Sankaran Muthat of Vatakketam in Triprayar was a student of Manorama Thampuratti of Calicut. He lived at Paliam, teaching students there. He wrote a commentary named Prasika, on the eleventh book of the Bhagavad Gita, based on earlier commentaries of his student, Paliath Achan:

നിജശിഷ്യ പാലിയേശ-
പ്രാര്‍ത്ഥനയാ ശങ്കരഖ്യ ശിവവിപ്ര:
ദാഗവതൈകാദശഗാ:
പ്രാക്തനവിവ്യതീ: സമുച്ചിനോമ്യദ്യ

nijaSishya pAliyESa-
prArththhanayA Sankarakhya Sivavipraha
dAgavathaikAdaSagAha
prAkthanavivyathIha samuchchinOmyadya

The Paliam family had a rich collection of manuscripts in Sanskrit and Malayalam. At the time of family partition, this collection was donated to the Kerala University Manuscript Library and the Tripunithura. Today, very few Paliam members reside in Thrissur.

Paliam Satyagraham 
Paliam satyagraha was a movement in 1947–48 to allow entry for Hindus of lower castes in the roads surrounding the Paliam family complex in Chendamangalam and the temples. Paliyam Satyagraha is the first post-independence Satyagraha organized in the state of Kerala. While the Guruvayur and Vaikom struggles were initiated and led by the progressive sections among the upper caste Hindus, the Paliyam struggle was unique since it was initiated by the Dalits and backward classes against the ban imposed by upper caste sections on the movement of Dalits on the Paliyam roads. 

On December 17, 1947 the Paliyam struggle commenced. Before that some efforts were made to avoid a struggle. On August 26, 1945 itself, the Praja Mandalam Working Committee met at Mala and decided to submit a memorandum to the Cochin Raja and set up a committee for launching direct action, if the Raja did not act. But no action was taken. On May 18, 1946 a delegation led by Kurur Nilakantan Namboodiripad met the Raja and submitted a fresh memorandum. The Raja explained the difficulties in getting the temples opened for all castes. The delegation then announced that they would be constrained to initiate a mass agitation.

The members of the Paliam family argued that certain roads leading to their residences were private roads, and, therefore they had the right to make them designated roads where they could ban movement of dalits and backward classes. In those days Namboodiris used to marry women from the Paliam family. Venmony Narayanan Namboodiri, though thus connected with the Paliyam family, was a different person. He had attended and agreed to preside over joint meeting of the Yogakshema Sabha. SNDP Yogam, Pulaya Mahasabha and the Communist Party of India and expressed solidarity to the Paliyam struggle. A few like Sukumaran Achan, Kochukuttan Achan and Satyapalan Achan though belonging to the Paliyam family, being progressive minded, openly questioned the ban on the movement of dalits in the so-called designated roads, which according to them were really public roads.

The theme slogan of the Paliyam struggle was “Open Paliyam Roads”.

The direct action of the Paliyam struggle started on December 4, 1947 and lasted 97 days ending on March 9, 1948.

A unique feature of the Paliyam struggle was the scale and variety of participation. For instance, groups of women from Ernakulam, members and activists of SNDP Yogam, Bidi Workers’ Trade Union, Yukthi Vada Sanghom (Rationalist group) Arya Mahajanasabha, Kochi Praja Mandalam, CPI unit of Anthikkad, Socialist Party of Mala, Tile Workers’ Union of Panamkulam, V.K.M. Mahasabha, Christian Youth Movement, Kerala Socialist Party and RSP participated in the struggle. A Namboodiri Jatha was also held in which very progressive men like V.T. Bhattathiripad, O.M.C. Narayanan Namboodiri, Akkithat Achuthan Namboodiri, M.R. Bhattathiripad and others participated. K. Balakrishnan, the fearless journalist and KSP leader also made his presence felt at Chendamangalam, the venue of Paliyam struggle.

The Press, however, took an unfriendly attitude to the struggle. They justified the closure of Paliyam Roads, as they were privately owned. On one side of the main road men of the Paliyam family lived and on the other side the houses had been assigned to their spouses. Already Christians, Muslims and Jews had been permitted to use the roads selectively for rendering trade and commercial services. But by tradition and to protect the privacy of the family members, the roads had been closed to dalits. The Press tried to inform the public that the Ernakulam District Court had decreed the right of Paliyam family to decide on the use of their private roads.

To defeat the struggle the Paliyam Manager was trying to construct walls to block the roads to users. The allegations that the movement on the roads would disturb the ladies of the house, pollute the sanctity of the temple in the vicinity and the struggle was inspired by the communists were wrong.

The Estate Manager of the Paliyam family was the son of a maharaja from the Cochin royalty. He used that influence and brought a big contingent of police and they were allowed to open a police camp at Thekke Madhom (the present Jubilee Hall). On December 7, 1947, a special Magistrate and armed police arrived from Kodungallur and a District Court started functioning from the same venue.

Thampi Menon and V.G. Ramachandran were two police officers who had participated in the attack on the satyagrahis of Paliyam struggle. In their reminiscences they had said that the Paliyath Achans had given excellent treatment to the police officials and lavished on them whatever was needed to please them. When the struggle was over, the police force was ordered to leave Chendamangalam. When they left they ransacked houses and looted coconuts, rice, banana, vessels and whatever material movable property they could lay their hands on.

The success of this and similar movements led to the temples in Kochi being opened for all Hindus in 1948.

Fall of the Paliath Achan 
Paliath Achan's fall from sublime was purely the edit of god, not a disgraceful one. He was away from the corridors of power, but his prestige and good deeds  would last for eternity surpassing the ex-rulers.  According to a popular Malayalam saying,'' half of Cochin belonged to Paliam. Nearly 12,000 tenants tilled Paliam lands, added to which was the ownership of 41 temples.'' In 1956, the estate was partitioned. All 214 heirs received lands and goods worth a lakh each. Some sold their inheritance and invested elsewhere; those who didn’t lost much in land reforms passed by the Kerala government. Slowly, the Paliam complex grew empty of family, staff, guards and attendants.Paliam family's  glorious days are gone in the shifting sand dunes of time but their memories and contributions are frozen in the museum. Today, the Paliam family lives like any other ordinary Nair family.

See also
 History of Kerala
 History of Kochi
 Cochin Royal Family
 Nair

References

 P. J. Cherian : Perspectives on Kerala history – The Second Millennium
 Akhilavijnanakosam Malayalam encyclopaedia, Vol.4, D.C. Books (1990)
 Prof. M. Radhadevi : Paliam Family, Saga of Paliam Family
 Dr. K. Kunjunni Raja : Literary Patronage By Paliam Family, Saga of Paliam Family

External links
History of Cochin

Indian noble families
Politicians from Kochi
Kerala families
Nair